Velikaš is the Serbo-Croatian word for 'magnate', derived from  ('great, large, grand'). It was used to refer to the highest nobility of Serbia in the Middle Ages and Croatia in the Middle Ages while the highest nobility in Bosnia were called vlastelin (lower  status). It is the equivalent of boyar, used in Eastern Europe.

Titles used by the higher nobility include vojvoda (general, duke), veliki župan, etc.

Serbian magnates

Serbian Empire
Magnates with Byzantine court titles
 prince Simeon Uroš, Dušan's half-brother, duke of Epirus and Acarnania
 Jovan Asen, Dušan's brother-in-law, governor in southern Albania
 Jovan Oliver, Dušan's close associate,  and governor in Ovče Pole and left Vardar
 Dejan, Dušan's brother-in-law, governor of Pčinja
 Branko, Dušan's relative, governor of Ohrid
 Preljub, Dušan's son-in-law, duke of Kastoria, Voden and Veria, and governor of Thessaly
 Vojihna, Dušan's relative,  and governor of Drama
 Grgur, Dušan's relative (son of Branko),  and governor of Polog

Magnates with Slavic court titles
 Altoman Vojinović, son of  Vojin and son-in-law of  Mladen

Croatian magnates

References

Slavic titles
Serbian noble titles